Rudolf Antonín Dvorský (24 March 1899 – 2 August 1966) was a Czechoslovak singer, swing musician, composer and a bandleader of the Melody Boys.

Filmography 
 Him and His Sister (1931) - Singing postman
 From Saturday to Sunday (1931) - Pavel, friend of Ervín
 Muži v offsidu (1931) - Singer
 The Good Soldier Schweik (1931) - Commissioned officer
 The Ideal Schoolmaster (1932) - Bandleader
 The Inspector General (1933) - 
 V cizím revíru (1934) - Conductor in the Hotel Richmond
 Jedna z milionu (1935) - Musician
 Raging Barbora (1935) - Singer
 Cácorka (1935) - Singer at the bar
 Pan otec Karafiát (1935) - With his orchestra Melody-boys
 Světlo jeho očí (1936) - Conductor
 Three Men in the Snow (1936) - Conductor
 Manželství na úvěr (1939) - Conductor
 Krb bez ohně (1939) - Vilém Kristen
 Malí velcí podvodníci (1939) - Dr. Pařík
 Umlčené rty (1939) - Publisher
 Lízino štěstí (1939) - Dr. Pařík
 U pokladny stál... (1939) - Singer
 Christian (1939) - Conductor and singer
 Srdce v celofánu (1939) - Singer at the operetta
 Madla zpívá Evropě (1939) - Don Manuel
 Těžký život dobrodruha (1939) - Singer
 Za tichých nocí (1939) - Conductor
 Půjčovna talentů (1939)

Selected Discography 
 Vzpomínka na Miláno (Supraphon, 1957)
 Jen se s písničkou smát (písně z let 1938–1944) (Supraphon, 1986)
 20x R. A. Dvorský & Melody Boys (Supraphon, 1996)
 Vzpomínky (FR centrum, 2003)
 Vzpomínky 2 (FR centrum, 2004)
 Vzpomínky 3 (FR centrum, 2005)
 Vzpomínky 4 (FR centrum, 2006)
 Rio Rita (FR centrum 2006)

External links
 
 R. A. Dvorský biography at Weimar Rundfunk an online radio station that frequently plays Dvorský's recordings.

1899 births
1966 deaths
Czechoslovak jazz musicians
Czechoslovak songwriters
People from Dvůr Králové nad Labem